The term chronic subjective dizziness (CSD) is used to describe a commonly encountered type of dizziness that is not easily categorized into one of several other types, and for which the physical examination is typically normal.  Patients with CSD frequently initially suffer a sudden injury of some sort to their vestibular system, the neurologic network that preserves sense of balance. Even after this initial injury has healed, people with CSD usually describe a vague sense of unsteadiness worsened by triggers in their environment such as high places, standing on moving objects, or standing in motion-rich environments like busy streets or crowds. There is a clear indication that anxiety and other mental illnesses play a role in the dizziness symptoms that occur with CSD. However, the condition is categorized as chronic functional vestibular disorder, not  as a structural or psychiatric condition.

Proposals include renaming it persistent postural-perceptual dizziness (PPPD) which better captures the multiple aspects of the condition under its title. It is under that title the World Health Organization has included PPPD in its draft list of diagnoses to be included to the next edition of the International Classification of Diseases (ICD-11) in 2017.

Signs and symptoms
Symptoms can include:
 A constant sense of unsteadiness, rocking or swaying, dizziness or lightheadedness
 Disequilibrium on most days for at least 3 months
 Spatial orientation problems
 Off-kilter sensation
 Extreme sensitivity to movement and/or complex visual stimuli such as grocery stores or driving in certain weather conditions
 Worsening dizziness with experience of complex visual environments such as walking through a grocery store
 Heavy-headedness; a feeling of floating, wooziness

Symptoms of CSD can be worsened by any self-precipitated motion, usually from the head, or the witnessing of motion from another subject. These are usually less noticeable when the person is lying still.

Diagnosis
Diagnosis can be difficult as there is not a specific test for PPPD but rather a series of elimination tests for other vestibular causes.  If elimination test are all normal and the symptoms match a PPPD diagnosis is possible.

Treatment
Effective treatments include vestibular rehabilitation therapy, medications such as SSRIs and psychotherapy, including the most effectively represented cognitive behavioral therapy.

Promising results were also found with transcranial direct-current stimulation combined with vestibular rehabilitation with significant improvement in symptoms of patients over a sham group in an exploratory study.

More recently, a study showed non-invasive vagus nerve stimulation to offer significant effect in PPPD patients regarding the quality of life, postural balance control, attack severity and depression level, with no reported serious side effects. The findings are argued to imply vagus nerve stimulation to be a safe and promising treatment option in patients with treatment-refractory PPPD and suggesting the need for further research.

History
Perhaps the first account of CSD was the German neurologist Karl Westphal's portrayal in the late 1800s of people who suffered dizziness, anxiety and spatial disorientation when shopping in town squares.  This phenomenon was called "agoraphobia", meaning a fear of the marketplace.  The term is now used to describe a psychological fear, but Westphal's original description included many symptoms of dizziness and imbalance not included in the modern psychiatric definition. Unlike people who feel anxious in crowds because they feel something bad will happen, people with CSD may dislike crowds because all the movement leads to a sensation of dizziness.

References

Symptoms
Neurological disorders